Galdieria is a genus of red algae belonging to the family Galdieriaceae. It was created by an Italian botanist Aldo Merola in 1981 for the identification from the species of Cyanidium.

Species:

Galdieria daedala 
Galdieria maxima 
Galdieria partita 
Galdieria phlegrea 
Galdieria sulphuraria

References

Cyanidiophyceae
Red algae genera